Brighter Than Sunlight is the third full-length album from the band, Ellison, released for digital download in 2012. Ellison worked on Brighter Than Sunlight for over three years, finally releasing it four years after their last album, Color of Compassion, was released.

Track listing

Personnel
Josh Hill – vocals, guitar, synth
Ian Bolender – guitar
Kent Landvatter – bass, backing vocals
Stefan Wright – drums, percussion

References

External links
 
 

Ellison (band) albums